Oswaldtwistle ( "ozzel twizzel") is a town in the Hyndburn borough of Lancashire, England,  southeast of Blackburn, contiguous with Accrington and Church. The town has a rich industrial heritage, being home to James Hargreaves, inventor of the spinning jenny and Sir Robert Peel of calico printing fame. The Leeds and Liverpool Canal passes through the town and was responsible for the export of much of the area's cotton produce.

At the 2011 census, it had a population of 11,803.

History

The name is derived from "Oswald" and "Twistle". The word "twistle" is an old English word meaning "brooks meet". Legend has it that Saint Oswald, King of Northumbria passed through, giving the area its full title of Oswald's Twistle, which in time came to be Oswaldtwistle.

However, it is more likely derived from the name of the Anglo-Saxon who farmed the land.

The Peel family
Robert Peel was born at Peelfold (within the township) in 1723, and laid the family fortunes by innovations in calico printing. A particularly successful pattern featured a sprig of parsley, so Robert Peel became known as "Parsley Peel". Robert Peel went into business with his Brother-in-law, Jonathan Haworth in 1760, establishing the Brookside Mill Calico Works, the remnants of which are still visible in Bury Meadow Nature Reserve.

The soubriquet helps distinguish him from his son also Robert Peel, who was born at Peelfold in 1750 and went on to become a successful cotton mill owner (with large works at Bury and  Burton on Trent), a very rich man, an MP and a Baronet.

Sir Robert's son (Parsley Peel's grandson), born at Bury was yet another Robert Peel and in due course Sir Robert Peel; he was a full-time politician and rose to be Prime Minister. Another historical figure associated with the textile industry was James Hargreaves, inventor of the Spinning Jenny.

Power loom riots

The people of Oswaldtwistle were involved in the power loom riots of 1826. The mechanisation of the textile industry (with the introduction of looms powered by steam engines from the 1820s onwards) resulted in redundancies, low wages, and starvation.

On 26 April, a large number of cotton workers attacked the factory in White Ash (Brookside Mill) in Oswaldtwistle, about a mile from Hargreaves' workshop, destroying looms and other equipment. The riots went on for three days, extending to all cotton towns in central Lancashire.

Coal
Oswaldtwistle is part of the Burnley Coalfield and had a number of coal mines such as Aspen Colliery  next the canal and the East Lancashire line, having both a canal basin and railway siding. Mining here is thought to have commenced in the early 19th century and the colliery closed in 1930. The remains of the site which includes two stone-built engine beds and a bank of 24 beehive type coke ovens are protected as a scheduled monument.

Others in the hills to the south, include: Broadfield Colliery  which in the 1840s had a surface tramroad connected to the printworks at Foxhill Bank via Moscow Mills; Sough Lane Colliery  which had a tramroad connecting it to Knuzden; And Town Bent Colliery .

PoW camps
During World War II, a number of PoWs (particularly Italians) were interned in camps near Oswaldtwistle.

Governance
Oswaldtwistle was once a township in the ancient parish of Whalley, covering Oswaldtwistle Moor in the south and with Knuzden Brook forming the boundary with Blackburn, and as far as the village of Belthorn. The township became a civil parish in 1866.

Between 1894 and 1974, the area was administered by an urban district. It has since become an unparished part of the borough of Hyndburn.

Economy
It is important to note the contribution of Alfred N. Waterhouse in Oswaldtwistle. In the 1940s, he created what became Shopfitters Lancashire Ltd and in the 1950s, the firm moved from Accrington to Rhyddings Mill, Oswaldtwistle. He was a very successful entrepreneur who manufactured the shopfittings. At its peak in the 1960s, Shopfitters (Lancashire) Ltd employed over 80 salesmen nationally, and had an annual turnover measured in millions, in an age when a new house cost about £3,000. The firm closed in the 1980s.

The town centre is home to a number of high street multiples, including: Bargain Booze, Coral, Betfred, Cohens Chemist, Travis Perkins, as well as McColl's (previously Gateway), which opened in 1980. There is also a Tesco Express, which opened in 2009, built on the site of the former retained fire station, which closed in 2003. A Spar is in the town, which opened in 1991.  There are also a number of independent businesses in the town - Whitaker’s Butchers, sues barbers, martins bakery and the vault micro pub and gin bar to name a few. Other stores include an appliance repairs/sales, numerous takeaways, numerous barbers, estate agents, off licences, bakers, butchers, funeral directors and many more shops. There are several Boys' Brigade/Girl's Brigade groups in the town, along with groups for Scouts, Beavers and Cubs. Additionally, Hyndburn Comets, a group of majorettes, exists in the town.

Landmarks

Oswaldtwistle Moor

Oswaldtwistle Moor (adjacent to Haslingden Moor) is an extensive area of moorland to the south of Oswaldtwistle, with Haslingden Grane bordering the moor's southern edges, Belthorn to the west and Haslingden to the east. The area forms part of the West Pennine Moors.

In May 2007, plans were made to build a wind farm consisting of twelve wind turbines on the moors. This attracted both support and opposition, but the plan was approved by councillors in March 2010. In October 2012, the project was officially completed, and was called the Hyndburn Wind Farm.

Oswaldtwistle Mills
Oswaldtwistle Mills is a notable attraction; a textile mill converted into a craft fair and with an exhibition about life in the mill a hundred years ago. It is also home of the world's largest pear drop, made by Stockley's Sweets.

Civic Arts Centre and Theatre

Also of note is the 457 capacity, recently refurbished, Civic Theatre, known as the "Friendly Theatre" and the brand new Civic Arts Centre. . The ground floor was refurbished, and in August 2010, it opened as the Civic Arts Centre.

The first production performed at the Arts Centre was Romeo and Juliet, directed by young producer, Joanne Haworth. Since then, there have been many productions, with something different happening every week. There are workshops, and drama sessions most evenings, plus projects and new plays, being written, and performed, with at least four plays in production, at any one time. The Centre is now home to a number of theatre groups, including ReAct Academy, Dramatic Annie, Sparks, Oswaldtwistle Players and St Mary's Panto amongst others. The theatre now has a professional production company that produces shows that are toured around Lancashire.

The Civic Arts Centre is involved in local heritage projects, and organises outdoor festivals. Civic Arts Centre From 1 April 2015, the Arts Centre & Theatre merged, and the building is now known as the Civic Arts Centre and Theatre. It is home to Manford's Comedy Clubs and chosen, above all their other clubs, to host their first birthday party. Jason Manford and John Bishop have both performed there at Manford's Comedy evenings. Colin Manford and Emma Kearney chose the Civic for their wedding in June 2016.

Rhyddings Park
Rhyddings Park is the only formal park within Oswaldtwistle. It was originally the grounds of a private house belonging to a local mill owning family. It has been a public park since 1909. More information about Rhyddings Park can be found on the website of its active community group, Map location of Rhyddings Park

Oswaldtwistle Carnival
The carnival is held every two years. The committee was formed in June 2014, after a sixteen year gap, and the first event was successfully held that summer.

Education
Oswaldtwistle is home to Rhyddings (secondary school), Hippings Methodist Primary School, St. Mary's RC Primary School, St. Paul's CE Primary School, Moor End Primary School, St. Andrew's CE Primary School, West End Primary School, Oswaldtwistle School (a PRU), Broadfield Specialist School and White Ash Specialist School.

Sport
Oswaldtwistle Rovers F.C. were a football team in the late 19th century; they managed to reach the second round of the FA Cup in 1885.

Oswaldtwistle is also the home of Oswaldtwistle Juniors FC, a local junior football club that plays in the ADJFL and ELFA, they play their home matches on Saint Mary's RC Primary School field.

Notable people

 Gordon Birtwistle, Liberal Democrats MP for Burnley from 2010 to 2015
 Jackie Bray, England international footballer, born in Oswaldtwistle
 Raymond "Ossie" Clark, (1942–1996), fashion designer, nicknamed "Ossie" after the town
 Mike Duxbury, England international footballer
 Nicholas Freeston (1907–1978), Lancashire poet worked at a cotton mill in Oswaldtwistle
 James Hargreaves, creator of the spinning jenny
 Polly James TV actress in Liverbirds
 Eddie Paynter, England international test cricketer, born in Oswaldtwistle
 Sir John Tomlinson, Opera singer
 Thomas Wilmington, footballer (deceased)

Twinned town
In January 2017, the Carnegie Trust UK advertised for towns who wanted to take part in a pilot twin town scheme. Oswaldtwistle was chosen, and paired with Whitburn in Scotland. Initial visits have been made.

Whitburn, West Lothian,

See also
Listed buildings in Oswaldtwistle

References

External links

Villages in Lancashire
Unparished areas in Lancashire
Geography of Hyndburn
West Pennine Moors